The Canton of Arcis-sur-Aube is one of the 17 cantons of the Aube department, in northern France. Its INSEE code is 1002. Its population was 14,661 in 2017.

The canton of Arcis-sur-Aube was created in 1801. At the French canton reorganisation which came into effect in March 2015, the canton was expanded from 22 to 47 communes. Arcis-sur-Aube was extended by the communes of the canton Ramerupt (24 communes) and Piney (1 commune).

Communes 
There are 47 communes in canton of Arcis-sur-Aube:

References

Cantons of Aube